Micaela Diamond (born July 17, 1999) is an American actor and singer best known for her role as Babe in the Broadway musical The Cher Show.

Early life and education 
Diamond was born in Margate City, New Jersey. At the age of 11, she moved to New York City with her mother, Karen Diamond, to pursue a career in the performing arts. There, Diamond attended Fiorello H. LaGuardia High School.

In 2017, Diamond was accepted into the musical theatre program at Carnegie Mellon University. During a high school production, Gypsy, in which she played Louise, an agent saw her performance and signed her. She played the youngest version of Cher in The Cher Show landing the role three days before she had planned to move to Carnegie Mellon for her freshman year.

Career
Diamond made her professional debut in the musical television special of Jesus Christ Superstar Live in Concert on NBC as a featured member of the ensemble. She was also the understudy for Sara Bareilles' character, Mary Magdalene.

Diamond originated the role of Babe, the youngest version of Cher around the age of 7–19 in The Cher Show. Starred alongside Jarrod Spector, Teal Wicks, and Stephanie J. Block. she also appears on the musical cast album. On June 9, 2019, Diamond was named a 2019 Theatre World Awards honoree  for her role as Babe in The Cher Show.  Diamond was nominated for Best Breakout Broadway Performance of the Decade at the Broadway World Theatre Fans' Choice Award for her performance in The Cher Show.

In 2019, Diamond originated the roles of Lindy and Dorothy in the world premiere of Ethan Coen's A Play Is a Poem at Los Angeles' Mark Taper Forum. The play ran from September 11 to October 13, 2019, and was scheduled to begin performances Off-Broadway at the Atlantic Theater Company's Atlantic Stage 2 in New York City beginning May 14, 2020, but was postponed due to the COVID-19 Pandemic.

Diamond also originated the roles of Young Tori and Amelia in Williamstown Theatre Festival's world premiere production of Row which opened on July 17, 2021.

On May 17, 2022, it was announced that Diamond would play Lucille Frank opposite Ben Platt as Leo Frank in New York City Center's gala presentation production of Parade. Following their sold out production at New York City Center, a limited Broadway run was announced on January 10, 2023, with Diamond and Platt continuing their roles as Lucille and Leo Frank. The revival began previews on February 21, 2023 and is scheduled to open March 16, 2023 at the Bernard B. Jacobs Theatre. The short run is scheduled to conclude on August 6, 2023. High demand for tickets on the first day of sale resulted in temporarily crashing the Telecharge ticket site, resulting in error messages and queues of an hour long.

Theatre credits 

•

Filmography

Film

Television

Awards and nominations

References

External links 

 
 

1999 births
Living people
21st-century American actresses
21st-century American singers
21st-century American women singers
Actresses from New Jersey
American film actresses
American musical theatre actresses
Fiorello H. LaGuardia High School alumni
People from Margate City, New Jersey
Singers from New Jersey
Theatre World Award winners